Grayson is a home rule-class city in and the county seat of Carter County, Kentucky, United States, on US Route 60 and Interstate 64 in the state's northeastern region.  It is approximately 21 miles west of Ashland.  Within the city limits, the population was 4,217 at the 2010 census. Along with Carter County, the city is closely associated with the nearby Huntington-Ashland, WV-KY-OH Metropolitan Statistical Area and is often erroneously included  in the MSA being just 9 miles west of the M.S.A's western boundary.

The city has grown in size substantially since the opening of Interstate 64 in 1975 through Carter County. Immediately afterwards, Grayson experienced several years of commercial sector growth, mainly to serve the Interstate 64 traffic. Since 1990, the city has also seen significant growth in the residential sector with the Interstate making for a faster trip to and from Ashland. Beginning in 1995, AA Highway terminates in Grayson making the city a gateway to the Huntington-Ashland urban area.

History
After the Revolutionary War, George Washington's aide-de-camp Col. William Grayson received a  tract of land for his service during the war from the state of Virginia. By 1838, a small portion of this tract was set aside for the development of a town named for him. Although Grayson had only five streets and eighty lots, it was established by the General Assembly on February 6, 1844, and it was incorporated on February 22, 1860.
Grayson, Kentucky was a stop on the Eastern Kentucky Railway.

Geography
Grayson is located in east-central Carter County at  (38.334738, -82.942368), along the Little Sandy River, a tributary of the Ohio River.

Route 60 passes through the city as Main Street and is intersected in downtown by Kentucky Routes 1 and 7 (Carol Malone Boulevard). Interstate 64 runs through the northern end of the city, with access to KY 7 at Exit 172. Kentucky Route 9, the AA Highway, begins from KY 1-and-7 just north of the city limits and runs  to the Cincinnati area.

Climate
The climate in this area is characterized by hot, humid summers and generally mild to cool winters.  According to the Köppen Climate Classification system, Grayson has a humid subtropical climate, abbreviated "Cfa" on climate maps. Since 2002, nine different severe storms have struck Grayson, with each storm causing enough damage to warrant federal assistance for disaster recovery.

Education

Grayson is served by the Carter County School District. Schools located within the city includes:
Heritage Elementary School
Prichard Elementary School
East Carter Middle School
East Carter High School

The campus of Kentucky Christian University (formerly Kentucky Christian College) is located in Grayson.

Grayson has a lending library, a branch of the Carter County Public Library.

Demographics

As of the census of 2000, there were 3,877 people, 1,415 households, and 938 families residing in the city. The racial makeup of the city was 98.32% White, 0.52% African American, 0.39% Native American, 0.28% Asian, 0.03% Pacific Islander, 0.18% from other races, and 0.28% from two or more races. Hispanic or Latino of any race were 0.77% of the population.

There were 1,415 households, out of which 31.0% had children under the age of 18 living with them, 46.9% were married couples living together, 16.0% had a female householder with no husband present, and 33.7% were non-families. 31.0% of all households were made up of individuals, and 13.1% had someone living alone who was 65 years of age or older. The average household size was 2.31 and the average family size was 2.86.

In the city the population was spread out, with 21.9% under the age of 18, 19.0% from 18 to 24, 24.3% from 25 to 44, 18.5% from 45 to 64, and 16.3% who were 65 years of age or older. The median age was 32 years. For every 100 females, there were 83.0 males. For every 100 females age 18 and over, there were 78.0 males.

The median income for a household in the city was $19,683, and the median income for a family was $26,280. Males had a median income of $32,022 versus $18,875 for females. The per capita income for the city was $11,879. About 27.7% of families and 31.4% of the population were below the poverty line, including 44.8% of those under age 18 and 22.3% of those age 65 or over.

Notable residents
Charlie Borders, former Kentucky State Senator
Jason Smith, chef, TV personality
Robin L. Webb, Kentucky State Senator and former Kentucky State Representative
Carol Malone Operatic soprano at the Deutsche Oper Berlin, San Francisco and Metropolitan Operas.
Jill York, former member of the Kentucky House of Representatives
Montana Fouts, All American softball pitcher for University of Alabama

See also
East Carter High School shooting, a school shooting that occurred in Grayson in 1993

References

External links

 City website

Populated places established in 1844
Cities in Carter County, Kentucky
County seats in Kentucky
Cities in Kentucky